Rory Owen Donnellan (20 June 1941 – 15 January 1977) was a South African first-class cricketer.

Donnellan was born at Durban in June 1941. He was educated at Durban High School, before to study in England as a Rhodes Scholar at Magdalen College, Oxford. While studying at Oxford, he played first-class cricket for Oxford University in 1963, making five appearances. He scored 173 runs in his five matches, at an average of 17.30 and a high score of 47. In addition to playing cricket, Donnellan was an equestrian who represented South Africa at the Evesham Horse Show in England. Donnellan died in a climbing accident in the Drakensberg in January 1977.

References

External links

1941 births
1977 deaths
People from Durban
South African Rhodes Scholars
Alumni of Magdalen College, Oxford
South African cricketers
Oxford University cricketers
South African male equestrians
Accidental deaths in South Africa